The 1974 Los Angeles Dodgers won the National League West by four games over the Cincinnati Reds, then beat the Pittsburgh Pirates in the 1974 National League Championship Series before losing to the Oakland Athletics in the 1974 World Series.

Offseason 
 October 27, 1973: Rick Auerbach was purchased by the Dodgers from the Milwaukee Brewers.
 December 3, 1973: Sergio Ferrer was drafted from the Dodgers by the Minnesota Twins in the 1973 rule 5 draft.
 December 5, 1973: Willie Davis was traded by the Dodgers to the Montreal Expos for Mike Marshall.
 December 5, 1973: Pete Richert was traded by the Dodgers to the St. Louis Cardinals for Tommie Agee.
 December 6, 1973: Claude Osteen and Dave Culpepper (minors) were traded by the Dodgers to the Houston Astros for Jimmy Wynn.

Regular season 
Mike Marshall set a record by pitching in 106 games in 1974, a record that still stands today.

Season standings

Record vs. opponents

Opening Day lineup

Notable transactions 
 April 3, 1974: Bruce Ellingsen was traded by the Dodgers to the Cleveland Indians for Pedro Guerrero.
 July 11, 1974: Gail Hopkins was purchased by the Dodgers from the Hawaii Islanders.

Roster

Player stats

Batting

Starters by position 
Note: Pos = Position; G = Games played; AB = At bats; H = Hits; Avg. = Batting average; HR = Home runs; RBI = Runs batted in

Other batters 
Note: G = Games played; AB = At bats; H = Hits; Avg. = Batting average; HR = Home runs; RBI = Runs batted in

Pitching

Starting pitchers 
Note: G = Games pitched; IP = Innings pitched; W = Wins; L = Losses; ERA = Earned run average; SO = Strikeouts

Other pitchers 
Note: G = Games pitched; IP = Innings pitched; W = Wins; L = Losses; ERA = Earned run average; SO = Strikeouts

Relief pitchers 
Note: G = Games pitched; W = Wins; L = Losses; SV = Saves; ERA = Earned run average; SO = Strikeouts

Postseason

1974 National League Championship Series 

The Dodgers beat the Pittsburgh Pirates in four games in the NLCS.

Game One 
October 5, Three Rivers Stadium

Game Two 
October 6, Three Rivers Stadium

Game Three 
October 8, Dodger Stadium

Game Four 
October 9, Dodger Stadium

1974 World Series 

The Dodgers were defeated by the Oakland Athletics in five games in the World Series.

AL Oakland Athletics (4) vs. NL Los Angeles Dodgers (1)

Awards and honors 

National League Most Valuable Player
Steve Garvey
Cy Young Award
Mike Marshall
Gold Glove Award
Andy Messersmith
Steve Garvey
Comeback Player of the Year Award
Jimmy Wynn

NL Player of the Month
Tommy John (April 1974)
NL Player of the Week
Tommy John (Apr. 22–28)
Jimmy Wynn (May 6–12)
Mike Marshall (June 17–23)
Davey Lopes (Aug. 19–25)
Ron Cey (Sep. 16–22)

All-Stars 
1974 Major League Baseball All-Star Game
Andy Messersmith starter
Steve Garvey starter
Ron Cey starter
Jimmy Wynn starter
Mike Marshall reserve
Major League Baseball All-Star Game MVP Award
Steve Garvey

Sporting News awards 
TSN Pitcher of the Year Award
Mike Marshall
TSN Fireman of the Year Award
Mike Marshall
TSN National League All-Star
Jimmy Wynn
Andy Messersmith
Steve Garvey

Farm system

1974 Major League Baseball Draft

This was the tenth year of a Major League Baseball Draft.  The Dodgers drafted 23 players in the June draft and six in the January draft.

The top pick was pitcher Rick Sutcliffe from Van Horn High School in Independence, Missouri. Sutcliffe would go on to win the 1979 Rookie of the Year Award. The Dodgers traded him to the Cleveland Indians in 1982 but he would remain in the league through 1994. He accumulated a record of 171–139, was a three-time All-Star and won the 1984 National League Cy Young Award, while with the Chicago Cubs.

They also drafted infielder Jim Riggleman in the fourth round. While he never made the Majors as a player he had a stint as the Dodgers Major League Bench coach and would become a successful Major League Manager with four different clubs.

Notes

References 
Baseball-Reference season page
Baseball Almanac season page

External links 
1974 Los Angeles Dodgers uniform
Los Angeles Dodgers official web site

Los Angeles Dodgers seasons
Los Angeles Dodgers season
National League West champion seasons
National League champion seasons
Los Angel